The   (princely house) was the oldest collateral branch (ōke) of the Japanese Imperial Family created from the Fushimi-no-miya, the oldest of the four branches of the imperial dynasty allowed to provide a successor to the Chrysanthemum throne should the main imperial line fail to produce an heir.

The Yamashina-no-miya house was formed in 1870 by Prince Moriosa, the 10th son of Prince Fushimi Sadayoshi, who was given his title by Emperor Meiji. As Prince Moriosa was childless, the title passed briefly first to his grandnephew Prince Kikumaro, then to Prince Morimasa, the fourth son of Prince Kuni Asahiko. Princess Masako, the eldest daughter of Prince Morimasa, was married to Crown Prince Euimin of Korea.

On October 14, 1947, Prince Nashimoto Morimasa lost his imperial status and became an ordinary citizen, as part of the American Occupation's abolition of the collateral branches of the Japanese Imperial family. On his death without male heirs in 1951, the main line of the Nashimoto-no-miya became extinct.

The Nashimoto-no-miya palace was located in the Aoyama district of Shibuya, Tokyo.

References 

 Lebra, Sugiyama Takie. Above the Clouds: Status Culture of the Modern Japanese Nobility. University of California Press (1995).